Ivaylo Lazarov (Bulgarian: Ивайло Лазаров; born 11 April 1992) is a Bulgarian footballer who plays as a midfielder for Dobrudzha.

Career

Vitosha Bistritsa
Lazarov joined Vitosha Bistritsa in 2016 from Chernomorets Balchik. He completed his full professional debut for the team on 22 July 2017 in a league match against Cherno More Varna.

Dunav Ruse
On 24 June 2019, Lazarov signed with Dunav Ruse.

References

External links
 

1992 births
Living people
Bulgarian footballers
Association football midfielders
PFC Dobrudzha Dobrich players
FC Dunav Ruse players
FC Chernomorets Balchik players
FC Vitosha Bistritsa players
FC Hebar Pazardzhik players
First Professional Football League (Bulgaria) players
People from Dobrich